The Shaping horned toad (Atympanophrys shapingensis) is a species of frog in the family Megophryidae.
It is endemic to China and known only from Sichuan and Yunnan provinces.
Its natural habitats are subtropical or tropical moist montane forests, subtropical or tropical high-altitude shrubland, and rivers.
It is threatened by habitat loss.

Males measure  and females  in length.

References

Atympanophrys
Amphibians of China
Endemic fauna of China
Taxonomy articles created by Polbot
Amphibians described in 1950